Xue Yiwei (born in 1964) is a Chinese author. 

His hometown is Changsha, Hunan, and his birthplace was Chenzhou in the same province. He attended the Beijing University of Aeronautics (now Beihang University) in a computer science program, gaining a BsC. Next he attended the Université de Montréal, taking a program in English literature, attaining a Master of Arts. Finally he attended the Guangdong University of Foreign Studies in a doctoral program in linguistics and received his degree.

In 2002, he relocated to Canada, due to his disenchantment with the materialism-focused direction of literature in his home country. In February of that year he occupied an apartment in proximity to the St. Joseph Oratory, in Côte-des-Neiges. In 2016 he was still in the same apartment. In 2016 CBC Radio described him as having a high level of popularity in China, known to "millions of people". Ha Jin stated that Xue is a "maverick".

Shenzheners was his first work translated into English. Previously he was not known among Anglophone audiences, and he lived in Montreal in relative obscurity.

Works
 Novels
 Desertion (1989) - A new edition was issued in 2012.
 Dr. Bethune's Children (2011) - English translation 2017 This was not published in China.
 The novel addresses the life of Norman Bethune.
 Farewells from a Shadow (2013)
 Empty Nest (2014)
 King Lear and Nineteen Seventy-Nine
 Beginning in March 2020 it was serialized in a magazine in China. Xue had intentions to have an English translation produced.
Celia, Misoka, I (2016) - English translation 2022

 Short stories
 Shenzheners - English translation 2016
 four other works

References

People from Changsha
Living people
People from Côte-des-Neiges–Notre-Dame-de-Grâce
Writers from Montreal
Writers from Changsha
Writers from Hunan
Short story writers from Hunan
People from Chenzhou
1964 births
Beihang University alumni
Université de Montréal alumni